Op hoop van zegen is a 1934 Dutch drama film directed by Alex Benno after the 1900 play by the same name by Herman Heijermans.

Cast
Esther De Boer-van Rijk	... 	Kniertje
Philip Dorn	... 	Geert - haar zoon (as Frits van Dongen)
Jan Van Ees	... 	Barend - haar zoon
Annie Verhulst	... 	Jo - haar nicht
Willem van der Veer	... 	Reder Bos
Sophie de Vries-de Boer	... 	Reder Bos zijn vrouw (as Sophie d.Vries-d.Boer v. Rijk)
Miep van den Berg	... 	Clementine - z'n dochter
Coen Hissink	... 	Kaps - boekhouder
Willem Hunsche	... 	Simon - scheepstimmerman
Cissy Van Bennekom	... 	Marietje - z'n dochter (as Ciccy v. Bennekom)
August Kiehl	... 	Daantje
Anton Verheyen	... 	Kobus
Aaf Bouber	... 	Truus - een buurvrouw
Matthieu van Eysden	... 	Sergeant mariniers (as Matthieu v. Eijsden)

External links 
 

1934 films
Dutch black-and-white films
1934 drama films
Films directed by Alex Benno
Films about fishing
Dutch films based on plays
Films set in 1900
Dutch drama films
1930s Dutch-language films